Punctate hemorrhage is a capillary hemorrhage into the skin that forms petechiae.

References

Blood